James R. Baca (born September 6, 1945) is an American politician from New Mexico. A member of the Democratic Party, Baca served twice as New Mexico Commissioner of Public Lands from 1983 to 1987 and from 1991 to 1993 and as 27th mayor of Albuquerque from 1997 to 2001.

Career

Bureau of Land Management 
In 1993, Baca was appointed Director of the Bureau of Land Management in the administration of Bill Clinton, but was fired the next year amidst tensions with United States Secretary of the Interior Bruce Babbitt and Western state governors.

Campaigns 
Baca had run unsuccessfully for mayor of Albuquerque and the United States House of Representatives in 1985 and 1988, respectively. He challenged incumbent Governor Bruce King in the 1994 Democratic gubernatorial primary, but came third behind King and Lieutenant Governor Casey Luna.

Mayor of Albuquerque 
He was elected mayor of Albuquerque in 1997, but in his re-election bid he finished a distant fourth place in the 2001 mayoral election, won by his predecessor Martin Chávez. He ran to reclaim his previous position as Public Lands Commissioner in 2006, narrowly winning the Democratic primary against Ray Powell (who had succeeded him in that office in 1993), but losing the general election to incumbent Republican Lands Commissioner Patrick H. Lyons. He then served as state Natural Resource Trustee until his retirement in 2009.

As Mayor of Albuquerque, Baca also made an effort to lure the Canadian minor league baseball team the Calgary Cannons to Albuquerque with promises of a new $28 million stadium. The effort succeeded and the team was renamed The Albuquerque Isotopes. The move became part of the basis of a 2001 episode of The Simpsons, titled "Hungry, Hungry Homer," which features the owners of the Springfield Isotopes attempted to move their team to Albuquerque.

See also 
Baca family of New Mexico

References 

Fray Angélico Chávez, [[Origins of New Mexico Families|Origins of New Mexico Families: A Genealogy of the Spanish Colonial Period]], rev. ed. (Santa Fe: Museum of New Mexico, 1992)

External links 
Only in New Mexico – Baca's blog

|-

|-

1945 births
Living people
Baca family of New Mexico
Mayors of Albuquerque, New Mexico
Bureau of Land Management personnel
New Mexico Commissioners of Public Lands
State cabinet secretaries of New Mexico
New Mexico Democrats